Jyoti Prakash Dutta (born 3 October 1949) is an Indian Bollywood film producer, writer and director, best known for making patriotic action war films.

Personal life
Dutta is married to the Bollywood film actress Bindiya Goswami with whom he has two daughters Nidhi and Siddhi.

Career
Dutta produces his films under the banner of JP Films. He is known for directing many patriotic war films and films in the action genre. His films often have ensemble star casts. 

He made his directorial debut with the 1985 action film Ghulami and went on to direct the action films Yateem (1988), Batwara (1989) and Hathyar (1989). 

In 1998, he was awarded the 'National Award for Best Feature Film on National Integration' from President of India for his super hit war film Border. 

He directed the patriotic war films  Refugee, LOC Kargil and the period drama Umrao Jaan.

He headed the feature film section jury for  the National Film Awards (2010), according to sources in the Union Ministry of Information and Broadcasting.

In 2013, it was announced that Dutta would undertake sequels to his 1997 film Border, and that Border 2'' would star Sangram Singh and Nafisa Ali’s son Ajit Sodhi. He owns the production company titled J P Gene.

Filmography

References

External links
 
 J P Dutta : Filmography
 O P Dutta : Filmography (Mr O P Dutta is the father of Mr J P Dutta, though a film director in his own right he also writes story and screenplays for Hindi films and is of late also   writing dialogues for his son Mr J P Dutta's films)

1949 births
Living people
Hindi-language film directors
Film directors from Mumbai
Punjabi people
20th-century Indian film directors
21st-century Indian film directors
Hindi film producers
Film producers from Mumbai
Screen Awards winners
Zee Cine Awards winners
Producers who won the Best Film on National Integration National Film Award
Directors who won the Best Film on National Integration National Film Award